English Evangelical Lutheran Church of Dansville, also known as Saint Paul's Lutheran Church, is a historic Lutheran church located at Dansville in Livingston County, New York. It was built in 1847, and is a one-story, late Greek Revival style frame church.  It has a front gable roof with a wide frieze and features rounded arched windows and a two-tiered steeple.  An education wing was added in 1924 and expanded in the 1950s, and a projecting entrance was added in 1947.  It was the church where Clara Barton founded the first local chapter of the American Red Cross in 1881.

It was listed on the National Register of Historic Places in 2013.

References

American Red Cross
Churches on the National Register of Historic Places in New York (state)
Greek Revival church buildings in New York (state)
Churches completed in 1847
Churches in Livingston County, New York
1847 establishments in New York (state)
National Register of Historic Places in Livingston County, New York